Melicytus is a genus of flowering plants in the family Violaceae. Hymenanthera is a synonym.

Species
 Melicytus alpinus – porcupine shrub (New Zealand)
Melicytus angustifolius (New Zealand) [pro. parte synonym of Melicytus dentatus ]
 Melicytus chathamicus – Chatham Island mahoe (Chatham Islands, New Zealand)
 Melicytus crassifolius – thick-leaved mahoe (New Zealand)
 Melicytus dentatus – tree violet (Australia), sometimes present in New Zealand
 Melicytus drucei – Druce's mahoe, Mt Egmont shrub mahoe 
 Melicytus flexuosus B.P.J.Molloy & A.P.Druce
 Melicytus lanceolatus – narrow-leaved mahoe
 Melicytus macrophyllus - large-leaved mahoe
 Melicytus micranthus – swamp mahoe
 Melicytus novae-zelandiae – coastal mahoe (New Zealand)
 Melicytus obovatus (New Zealand)
 Melicytus ramiflorus, J.R. & G. Forster – mahoe or whitey-wood

References

External links

 
Malpighiales genera
Taxonomy articles created by Polbot